Greek National Road 99 is a national highway on the island of Crete, Greece. It connects Heraklion with Arkalochori.

99
Roads in Crete